The Brame is a river in France.

Brame may also refer to:


People

Surname
Benjamin Brame (1772–1851), first mayor of Ipswich
Charlotte Mary Brame (1836–1884), English novelist
Erv Brame (1901-1949), pitcher for the Pittsburgh Pirates
Geneviève Brame, French writer
Gloria Brame (born 1955), American sexologist
Michael Brame (1944—2010), American linguist

Given name
Brame Hillyard (1876–1959), British tennis player

Other uses
Brame House, an historic Classical Revival-style house in Montgomery, Alabama
Brame & Lorenceau Gallery, an art gallery in Paris
Brame-Reed House, an historic house in Shelbyville, Tennessee